Carlos Carranza (born 30 November 1928) was a Uruguayan footballer. He played in 20 matches for the Uruguay national football team from 1953 to 1957. He was also part of Uruguay's squad for the 1956 South American Championship.

References

External links
 

1928 births
Possibly living people
Uruguayan footballers
Uruguay international footballers
Place of birth missing (living people)
Association football midfielders
C.A. Cerro players